Daniel Andersson (born 27 September 1974) is a former international speedway rider from Sweden.

Speedway career 
Andersson reached the final of the Speedway World Team Cup in the 1996 Speedway World Team Cup, he stood as reserve behind Stefan Dannö and Niklas Klingberg. He rode in the top tier of British Speedway from 1995 to 2002, riding for various clubs. He was also the runner-up in the Individual Speedway Junior World Championship in 1995 and Swedish Junior Champion in 1994.

World final appearances

World Team Cup
 1996 -  Hofheim, Hesse (with Stefan Dannö / Niklas Klingberg) - 5th - 14pts

References 

1974 births
Swedish speedway riders
Oxford Cheetahs riders
Cradley Heathens riders
Glasgow Tigers riders
Belle Vue Aces riders
Edinburgh Monarchs riders
Sportspeople from Stockholm
Living people